A Private Man (2004) is a crime novel by Australian author Malcolm Knox. It won the 2005 Ned Kelly Award for Best First Novel.

Plot summary

Dr John Brand has been dead for two days and his eldest son, Davis, suspects a cover-up.  Another son, Chris, is batting to save his career in the Sydney Test, and a neglected third, Hammett, lurks in the background. During the five days of the cricket match, the family struggles with the death and its recriminations.

Reviews

Simon Caterson in The Age notes that the novel "makes the audacious thematic move of presenting porn as a male obsession as widespread as porn's much more socially acceptable entertainment counterpart, sport".

Awards and nominations

 2005 winner Ned Kelly Award — Best First Novel
 2005 commended Commonwealth Writers Prize — South East Asia and South Pacific Region — Best Book 
 2005 shortlisted Tasmania Pacific Region Prize — Tasmania Pacific Fiction Prize 
 2005 longlisted Miles Franklin Literary Award 
 2005 shortlisted New South Wales Premier's Literary Awards — Christina Stead Prize for Fiction 
 2006 longlisted International Dublin Literary Award

References

2004 novels
Australian crime novels
Ned Kelly Award-winning works